Adam Elliot is an Australian writer and director.

Adam Elliot may also refer to:

Adam Elliot (traveller) (died 1700), English explorer implicated in the Popish plot
Adam Elliot (missionary) (1802–1878), Canadian missionary

Similar name/s:

Adam Elliott (born 1994), Australian rugby league footballer